Doug Martin (born 14 December 1955) is a Canadian former swimmer. He competed in the men's 200 metre butterfly at the 1976 Summer Olympics.

References

External links
 

1955 births
Living people
Olympic swimmers of Canada
Swimmers at the 1976 Summer Olympics
Sportspeople from Windsor, Ontario
Canadian male butterfly swimmers